Nu'u can refer to;
Nu'u - a male figure in Hawaiian mythology 
Nu'u village - in Samoa
nu'u - the word nu'u means village or the place where one is from, in the Samoan language